"All the Things (Your Man Won't Do)" is a song by American R&B singer Joe. It was written by Joe, Joshua Thompson, and Michele Williams and produced by Joe and Thompson. The song originally appeared on the soundtrack to the film Don't Be a Menace to South Central While Drinking Your Juice in the Hood and was later included as the opening track on his second studio album All That I Am (1997). It was his first hit on the US Billboard Hot 100, peaking at number 11 in 1996. The single was certified gold by the Recording Industry Association of America (RIAA) on April 10, 1996.

Music video

The official music video for the song was directed by Paul Hunter.

Track listings

Credits and personnel
 Special Tee – mixing
 Joshua Thompson – producer, writer
 Joe Thomas – producer, vocals, writer
 Michele Williams – writer

Charts

Weekly charts

Year-end charts

References

External links
 
 

1995 songs
1996 singles
1990s ballads
Joe (singer) songs
Island Records singles
Jive Records singles
Neo soul songs
Contemporary R&B ballads
Music videos directed by Paul Hunter (director)
Song recordings produced by Joe (singer)
Songs written by Joe (singer)
Songs written by Michele Williams